Rogers High School is a 3A public high school located in Rogers, Texas (USA). It is part of the Rogers Independent School District located in southeastern Bell County. In 2013, the school was rated "Met Standard" by the Texas Education Agency.

Athletics
The Rogers Eagles compete in:

Baseball
Basketball
Cross Country
Football
Golf
Powerlifting
Softball
Tennis
Track and Field
Volleyball

State titles
Team
Baseball - 
2007(2A), 2010(2A)
One-Act Play - 
2002(2A), 2005(2A), 2008(2A), 2009(2A), 2012(2A), 2013(2A)

Individual
Boys Track - 1600 Meter Run
2007(2A)

State finalists

Girls Basketball –
1986(2A)
Football –
1998(2A)
One-Act Play
1976(2A), 1978(2A), 1979 (2A), 2003(2A), 2004(2A), 2011(2A), 2015(3A)

Notable alumni
Jonathan Bane, football player
Taylor Jungmann, Major League Baseball pitcher

References

External links
 Rogers ISD

High schools in Bell County, Texas
Public high schools in Texas